People with the family name Durning include the following:

Alan Durning (born 1964), American socio-economic commentator
Bernard Durning (1893–1923), American silent film director and actor
Charles Durning (1923–2012), American actor
Francis Durning (1914–1999), New Zealand priest
George Durning (1898–1986)
Jeanine Durning, Choreographer
Rich Durning (1892–1948), American baseball pitcher